False Light or  Vals licht  is a 1993 Dutch film directed by Theo van Gogh. It was based on the eponymous novel by Joost Zwagerman about a young teenager who is attracted by the life of prostitutes.

Cast
Amanda Ooms as Lizzie Rosenfeld
Ellik Bargai as Simon Prins
Thom Hoffman as Wesley
Tom Jansen as Philip
Marijke Veugelers as Simon's mother
Cas Enklaar as Simon's father
Dik Boutkan

Việt nam 
 

Dutch drama films
Films based on Dutch novels
Films set in Amsterdam
Films shot in Amsterdam
1993 films
1990s Dutch-language films
Films directed by Theo van Gogh
Films about prostitution in the Netherlands